The Cheț is a right tributary of the river Barcău in Romania. It discharges into the Barcău in the city Marghita.

References

Rivers of Romania
Rivers of Bihor County